Dyschirius dostali is a species of ground beetle in the subfamily Scaritinae. It was described by Bulirsch & Fedorenko in 2007.

References

dostali
Beetles described in 2007